St. Mary Cathedral Basilica, also known as St. Mary's Cathedral Basilica, is a Roman Catholic place of worship situated in Galveston, Texas. It is the primary cathedral of the Archdiocese of Galveston-Houston and the mother church of the Catholic Church in Texas, as well as a minor basilica. Along with the Co-Cathedral of the Sacred Heart in Houston, St. Mary's serves more than 1.5 million Catholics living in the archdiocese.

History

In 1840, the Rev. John Timon, the newly appointed Apostolic Prefect of Texas, named fellow Vincentian priest Rev. John Odin, C.M., to be the resident Vice-Prefect of Texas. Fr. Odin embarked from New Orleans on a schooner bound for the Texas coast, arriving in Galveston early in 1841. There he found a community of Catholics eager to build a church for their small congregation.

In the months that followed, Father Odin procured enough money to begin construction of a wooden-frame church. He was assisted in this venture by Colonel Michael B. Menard and Dr. Nicholas Labadie, prominent Galvestonians. Colonel Menard is to be remembered as one of the founders of the City of Galveston.

On February 6, 1842, one month before his consecration as a bishop, Odin dedicated the completed structure to the Blessed Virgin Mary. The small, rectangular building measured . Odin, now the Apostolic Vicar of Texas, purchased a five-room cottage as the episcopal residence. He made an addition to the church structure of a small sacristy, and bought thirty benches for the convenience of his parishioners.

In 1845, Bishop Odin purchased 500,000 bricks from Belgium, which were shipped to Galveston as ballast. He would use the bricks in the construction of his dream: a larger, permanent church. The little frame church was moved out into the street, and work on the new St. Mary's began in 1847. The ceremony of laying the cornerstone took place on Sunday, March 14. Father Timon came to Galveston for the event and preached the sermon before a large crowd. On May 4, 1847, Pope Pius IX approved the establishment of the Diocese of Galveston and named Odin as its first bishop.

On November 26, 1848, the cathedral was ready for dedication. Once more Father John Timon was chosen as the principal speaker because of his close association with, and his pioneer work in, the diocese.

The cathedral basilica is notable as being one of the few buildings in Galveston that survived the devastating 1900 Galveston hurricane with only minimal damage.

Due to the tremendous growth in the City of Houston, in 1959 the Most Reverend Wendelin J. Nold, fifth bishop of the diocese, asked that the diocese be re-designated the Diocese of Galveston-Houston. This created a co-capital or "see" city in Houston, and Sacred Heart Church in Houston was named the "co-cathedral" of the diocese. This did not change the status of Galveston as a see city nor St. Mary Cathedral's place in the diocese. Since St. Mary Cathedral was the first Catholic cathedral in the state of Texas, and the original Diocese of Galveston encompassed the entire state, it has the distinction of being the mother church of all the Catholic dioceses in Texas.

St. Mary Cathedral was named a Texas state historic landmark in 1968 and a national historic landmark in 1973. In 1979, in recognition of the cathedral's importance to the community and the state of Texas, as well as the historical impact it had on Catholicism in the state of Texas, Pope John Paul II elevated St. Mary Cathedral to the status of a minor basilica.

The basilica today

The cathedral basilica sustained significant water damage during Hurricane Ike in 2008 and was closed for repairs until Easter 2014.

In 2009, the archdiocese appointed a director of special projects to oversee the cathedral basilica's restoration. As of July 2012, the roof was replaced, the pews were rebuilt and refinished, steel armature reinforcements were added to the two front spires, the confessionals and Stations of the Cross were refinished, and exterior masonry repairs, coating and chemical remediation had all been completed. A new concrete substructure was being built to support the floor, which is currently supported by the original wooden beams that were installed when the cathedral basilica was constructed in 1847.

See also

National Register of Historic Places listings in Galveston County, Texas
Recorded Texas Historic Landmarks in Galveston County
List of Catholic cathedrals in the United States
List of cathedrals in the United States

References

External links

Official Cathedral Site
Roman Catholic Archdiocese of Galveston-Houston Official Site

Mary's Cathedral, Galveston
Mary Galveston
Cathedral St. Mary's
Churches on the National Register of Historic Places in Texas
National Register of Historic Places in Galveston County, Texas
1847 establishments in Texas
Churches in Galveston, Texas
Recorded Texas Historic Landmarks